California State University, Chico, or commonly, Chico State, is a public university in Chico, California. Founded in 1887 by John Bidwell, it is the second oldest campus in the California State University system. As of the fall 2020 semester, the university had a total enrollment of 16,630 students. The university offers 126 bachelor's degree programs, 35 master's degree programs, and four types of teaching credentials. Chico is a Hispanic-serving institution (HSI).

History

On March 12, 1887, a legislative act was enacted to create the Northern Branch of the California State Normal School. Less than a month later, Chico was chosen as the location. On June 24, 1887, General John Bidwell donated  of land from his cherry orchard. Then on July 4, 1888, the first cornerstone was laid. On September 3, 1889, doors opened for the 90 enrolled students. The library opened on January 11, 1890, with 350 books. On June 20, 1891, the first graduation took place, a class of 15.

In 1910, Annie Kennedy Bidwell donated an additional  of land to be used for work with elementary agriculture. The next year Mrs. Bidwell donated an orange orchard lot 55 ×  as the children's playground, which is connected to the Training School. Twenty years later in 1921, legislation was enacted to change the school's name to Chico State Teacher's College. In 1922, Chico State Teacher's College added a junior college curriculum and awarded a certificate after two years. Also in 1922, Bidwell Mansion was turned into a women's dormitory, Bidwell Hall. In 1923 the first college paper, The Collegian, was published. In 1924, the state Board of Education allowed the school to grant baccalaureate degrees. Also in 1924, the wildcat was chosen as the mascot. In 1925 the alumni organization was founded. In 1927 a fire destroyed the Normal Building. That same year a gym was built on the grounds of Bidwell Mansion. In 1929, the cornerstone for the new administration building was laid on top of Normal Building's original cornerstone. In 1929 the student bookstore was established.

In 1935, Bidwell Hall was turned into a recreation and student center—the first student union. Also in 1935 a legislative act changed the college name from Chico State Teachers College to Chico State College. In 1937 evening classes started on campus and athletic fields were purchased from the Chico Board of Education. In 1939, chimes were installed in library tower. Sororities held a fund drive to raise $600 for them. In 1940 the college offered civilian pilot classes.

In 1948, dorms for 500 male students were set up on west side of Warner Street. The buildings were built during World War II and were used as bachelor quarters for a Marine Hospital in Klamath Falls, Oregon. They were brought to Chico State in sections and reconstructed in the spring of 1948. The two-story barrack-like structures had 36 rooms, each occupied by 4 students. North Hall later became a female dormitory. The speech and debate team was founded by Herbert Rae, Speech & Drama Department Chair.

In 1950, California's governor allowed state colleges to grant Master of Arts degrees. In 1951 the college reorganized from 18 departments into seven divisions with chairmen. Then in 1956 a new flagpost and sign in front of Kendall Hall was donated by the class of 1956. In the following year, 1957, a new cafeteria was built and the rose gardens were planted. In 1958 the first "telecourse" was taught, Psychology 51.

KCSC, a student-run radio station, launched, broadcasting old-time radio dramas on the campus public address system in 1951.

In 1970, the university closed First Street on campus to through traffic.

In 1972, Chico State College became California State University, Chico as a result of legislation passed in 1971.

In 1975, broadcasts of classes through closed circuit TV were used for the first time by residents in Oroville, Marysville and Colusa. Also in 1975, The Orion, the campus student newspaper, published its first issue. In 1977, the other campus paper, The Wildcat, changed its name to Chico News and Review and moved off campus to become an independent publication. In 1978 bike riding was restricted on campus.

Chico State's library was renamed in 1981 for father and son Morrison E. Meriam, professor of psychology from 1902 to 1934, and Theodore "Ted" Meriam, community leader, alumnus, and friend of the university, a member of the California State University Board of Trustees from 1961 to 1971, and its chair from 1968 to 1969.
 	
In 1987, Chico State was ranked as the top party school in the nation by Playboy.

CSU Chico opened its first sub-campus in Redding, affiliated with Shasta College, in 2007.

In 2005, student Matt Carrington was hazed to death at the Chi Tau (local) house, which had previously been expelled from the university in 2001 due to violations. Carrington died as a result of water intoxication during a hazing session involving the victim being forced to exercise and drink large quantities of water.

In 2010, the President of the Associated Student body, Joseph Igbineweka, was stabbed in a racially motivated attack.

In 2011, CSU, Chico received a Civic Learning Initiative Grant from the W. M. Keck Foundation to extend its efforts to establish civic engagement as a key component of students' academic success.

Academics

The university has more than 75 departments and offers more than 150 undergraduate degrees. It is organized into seven colleges and four schools:

College of Agriculture
College of Behavioral & Social Sciences
School of Social Work
College of Business
College of Communication & Education
School of Education
College of Engineering, Computer Science, & Construction Management
College of Humanities & Fine Arts
School of the Arts
College of Natural Sciences
School of Nursing

The university's library, the Meriam Library, has several special collections of Native American and Californian history.

Rankings

According to the U.S. News & World Report 2023 college rankings, Chico State was ranked at 13th for "Best Colleges for Veterans", tied 10 in Top Public Schools, 22 in Top Performers on Social Mobility, 70 in Best Undergraduate Engineering Programs teeing 12 in Civil Engineering and 206 in Nursing.

According to the U.S. News & World Report 2022 college rankings, Chico State was ranked tied at 17th for "Best Colleges for Veterans", tied 18 in Top Public Schools, tied 24 in Top Performers on Social Mobility, tied 75 in Best Undergraduate Engineering Programs and tied for 251 in Nursing.

According to the U.S. News & World Report 2021 college rankings, Chico State was ranked tied for 9th among 66 western regional public universities, tied at 16th for "Best Colleges for Veterans", tied at 22nd for "Best Undergraduate Teaching", tied at 41st for "Social Mobility", and tied for 26th overall among 127 regional universities in the western United States. Lastly it tied at 91 in Best Undergraduate Engineering Program at a schools where doctorate not offered.

Chico State was ranked 335th out of 650 colleges, universities, and service academies in the U.S. in the 2019 Forbes America's Top Colleges list, and was ranked 68th in the West, 73rd for "Best Value", and 113th among all public universities.

Campus
The California State University, Chico campus consists of a 119-acre main campus, the 800-acre Paul L. Byrne Memorial University Farm, and 2,330-acres of ecological reserves. These reserves include the Big Chico Creek Ecological Reserve (BCCER) and the Butte Creek Ecological Preserve (BCEP).

Early construction

The construction of the normal school building was begun in September, 1887. It was a large brick building, consisting of three stories and full basement. It was of Romanesque design with Elizabethan gables and artificial stone trimmings. The building was destroyed by a fire in 1927. The current administration building Kendall Hall was built on the site of the normal school in 1929.

Colusa Hall, completed in 1921 is the oldest building on campus. It was used for purposes related to the industrial arts, but now the building is now used as a conference and public events facility.

Arboretum
The Campus Arboretum is located across the campus of California State University, Chico along Big Chico Creek.

Nearby Bidwell Park includes  of a former arboretum, now run somewhat wild, which contains trees such as English oaks, hawthorn, cherry plum, bay laurel, cork oak, ponderosa, aleppo, and Monterey pines, willow, mulberry, linden, maple, catalpa, pine, and eucalyptus, collected from around the world.

Residence halls
Currently, the university can accommodate 2,150 or approximately 13% of the student body in seven on-campus residential halls. Sutter, Whitney, Shasta and Lassen halls are on the main campus, while Esken, Mechoopda and Konkow are near the athletic fields about a block and a half away from the main campus. Whitney, Shasta and Lassen are the names of major mountains in Northern California, and the others are named after Native American tribes which used to inhabit the area. Most buildings that make up the campus are named after counties in California.  University Village or "UV" is a university-owned dorm about a mile off campus. The university opened its newest dorm, Sutter Hall, for the fall 2010 semester. It is located between Whitney and Shasta and Lassen halls. For much of the fall 2010 semester, Sutter Hall's dining area remained closed.  However, it opened in the spring 2011 semester, featuring new dining options for students.

Meriam library
Meriam Library started out as an unnamed library in 1887, housed in what was then known as Chico State Normal School. In 1927, the Normal School building and its library burned down in a fire. The library found a new home in 1933 when a new building, Trinity Hall, was constructed. In 1959, Chico State College Library was built. The library was expanded and renamed to the "Learning Activities Resource Center" (LARC) in 1975. It was in 1985 when the library gained another expansion and its current name, Meriam Library. This name was dedicated after the family of Ted Meriam. A fourth floor of the library was constructed in 1985.

Student life

Associated Students, Chico

Associated Students, Chico is the student government at California State University, Chico. Associated Students, Chico owns and operates several student services on-campus including all vending machines, and foodservices, as well as the campus bookstore. The students of CSU, Chico also own their own student union building named the Bell Memorial Union which houses the Marketplace Cafe, the Chico State Wildcat Store, and the student government offices. Student officers are elected annually from among and by the students. Students are assessed a mandatory Activity Fee at registration which funds the student government and other programs.

The AS is generally divided into three areas, each the responsibility of one of three Associated Students standing committees. The AS' role as a government is manifested in the Government Affairs Committee. The student union is administered under the original authority of the Bell Memorial Union Committee. The administration of the businesses is under the original authority of the Business Committee. All of these areas are under the ultimate authority of the AS Board of Directors.

Office of Student Life and Leadership

Student Life and Leadership, formally the Student Activities Office, incorporates four programs: Student Organizations and Leadership Education (SOLE), Fraternity and Sorority Affairs (FSA), Rec Sports, and the Cross-Cultural Leadership Center (CCLC).

Town Hall Meeting
Chico State formed an event where Chico State students gather in a public area and discuss most current policy issues with their peers. Faculty members are also involved in this event. This event happens annually and students look forward to it all year. Once the opening comments and the welcome occur in the Bell Memorial Union Auditorium, the participants explore different locations on campus for "breakout sessions". These sessions give students a chance to share their research with their peers. Students have commented saying this event has inspired them to get more involved in the community and stay educated about current politics.

The Great Debate
The Great Debate was created to drive members of both the campus and the community to take part in a conversation about issues that have the ability to divide the community. There is a different topic that takes place every semester. An example of a topic is Climate Change. The event requires a full day where presentations and debates take place. Students partake in active listening and respectful communication exchange. Students from Communication Studies classes are the students who give presentations based on a previously chosen topic. At 6:15 pm, a formal debate is held by CSU, Chico Debate Team members and stakeholder Community Members.

Greek life
 Chico State has 26 fraternities and sororities, making up approximately 12 percent of the student population.

The Fraternity and Sorority Affairs (FSA) program embodies three Greek governed councils: the Interfraternity Council (IFC), the Multicultural Greek Council, and the Panhellenic Council.

Fraternities in the IFC include Alpha Sigma Phi, Kappa Sigma, Delta Chi, Lambda Chi Alpha, Phi Delta Theta, Phi Kappa Tau, Tau Kappa Epsilon, Sigma Nu and Sigma Pi. The Panhellenic Council includes Alpha Delta Pi, Alpha Gamma Delta, Alpha Omicron Pi, Alpha Phi, Gamma Phi Beta and Sigma Kappa. The Multicultural Greek Council includes Delta Xi Phi, Lambda Theta Nu, Lambda Theta Alpha, Lambda Sigma Gamma, Sigma Omega Phi, Upsilon Kappa Delta, Epsilon Sigma Rho, Nu Alpha Kappa and Gamma Zeta Alpha.

Demographics
Fall Freshman Statistics

Male to Female Percentage: 46:54%

CSU Chico along with CSU Bakersfield has the second largest enrollment percentage of Native Americans in the Cal State system.

Student media

KCSC Radio was founded in 1951. The university's student-run weekly newspaper, The Orion first began publishing in 1975. In 1989, The Orion won the National Pacemaker Award, the first of nine times the paper has won the top prize in college journalism. In 2009, The Orion won the National Pacemaker Award for the 11th time at the College Media Convention.

In 1997 Wild Oak Music Group, an independent record company, was founded and is run by the Music Industry students within the College of Humanities and Fine Arts.

Athletics

The university's athletic teams are known as the Chico State Wildcats. The school sponsors soccer, basketball, golf, cross country, and track and field for both men and women. The school sponsors softball and volleyball for women, and baseball for men. The school's athletic director is Anita Barker. The school competes in Division II of the National Collegiate Athletic Association (NCAA) in the California Collegiate Athletic Association (CCAA). Since 1998, Chico State's athletic teams have won 99 NCAA Championship berths, 40 CCAA titles, 24 West Region titles, and 15 NCAA national titles. The Wildcats softball team won the first AIAW Division III national championship in 1980, led by pitcher Kathy Arendsen. Chico excels in cross country and track and field in the California Collegiate Athletic Association.

The Wildcats of Chico State earned six team NCAA championships at the Division II level. NCAA Division II individual championships by Scott Bauhs (2008) Men's cross country and J. J. Jakovac (2002, 2004) and Kyle Souza (2011) Men's Golf Championships.

Chico State also has many club sports teams, including the Chico State Men's Rugby Club which plays in the division 1AA Pacific Western Rugby Conference.  The team has won the title of 15's Champions in 2013, 2018, and 2019.  They went on in their 2019 season to compete against Dartmouth for the 15's National Spring Championship, but fell short with Dartmouth winning the title.

 Men's Team (6)
Baseball (2): 1997, 1999
Golf (1): 1966
Swimming and diving (3): 1973, 1974, 1976

Sustainability

Chico State made The Princeton Review 2011 "Guide to Green Colleges", honoring campuses that "demonstrate a strong commitment to sustainability in their academic offerings, campus infrastructure, activities, and career preparation."

Noted people

Notable alumni

Faculty

University presidents

 Edward Timothy Pierce, 1889–1893
 Robert F. Pennell, 1893–1897
 Carleton M. Ritter, 1897–1899
 Charles C. Van Liew, 1899–1910
 Allison Ware, 1910–1917
 Elmer Isaiah Miller, 1910, 1917–1918
 Charles Osenbaugh, 1918–1930
 Clarence Knight Studley, 1930–1931
 Rudolph D. Lindquist, 1931
 Aymer Jay Hamilton, 1931–1950
 George Glenn Kendall, 1950–1966
 Robert Eugene Hill, 1966–1970
 Lew Dwight Oliver, 1970–1971
 Stanford Cazier, 1971–1979
 Robert L. Fredenburg, 1979–1980
 Robin Wilson, 1980–1993
 Manuel A. Esteban, 1993–2003
 Scott McNall, 2003–2004
 Paul Zingg, 2004–2016
 Gayle E. Hutchinson, 2016–present

See also

Notes

References

External links

 

 
1887 establishments in California
Chico
Educational institutions established in 1887
California State University, Chico
Schools accredited by the Western Association of Schools and Colleges
Tourist attractions in Chico, California
Universities and colleges in Butte County, California